Jack 'Jock' Cordner (9 June 1910 – 14 September 1996) was an Australian rules footballer who played for Footscray, Fitzroy and North Melbourne in the VFL.

Cordner played as a centreman and started his VFL career at Footscray. In two seasons with the club he managed just seven games due to a leg injury and he moved to Fitzroy in 1933. He played a couple of seasons with Fitzroy before being cleared to North Melbourne where he went on to play his best football. He won their 1938 Best and Fairest award and finished 6th in that year's Brownlow Medal. Cordner captained North Melbourne in 1941 but it would be his final season of league football, retiring due to injury. During his career he also represented Victoria at interstate football.

External links

1910 births
1996 deaths
Western Bulldogs players
Fitzroy Football Club players
North Melbourne Football Club players
Syd Barker Medal winners
Australian rules footballers from Victoria (Australia)